Charles "Papa" Cobb was an American football player and coach.  He served as the second head coach at the University of Washington, coaching one season in 1894 and compiling a record of 1–1–1.  Cobb played college football at Harvard University.

Head coaching record

References

Year of birth missing
Year of death missing
19th-century players of American football
Harvard Crimson football players
Washington Huskies football coaches